Han Jue (died after 566 BC), posthumously known as Han Xianzi, was the fifth head of the House of Han and a Jin politician and general. He was the son of Ziyu of Han. Han Jue's father died early and he was raised by Zhao Dun (赵盾), a senior Jin minister. Han Jue later became sima (司马), the minister of war, on Zhao Dun's recommendation. As sima, Han participated in the Battle of Bi (597 BC) and the Battle of An (589 BC). According to the Zuozhuan, Ziyu appeared to Han Jue in a dream the night before the Battle of An and warned him not to ride in the left or right side of the chariot to avoid being killed by Duke Qing of Qi. During the battle, the soldiers to Han Jue's left and right were shot by arrows. In 583 BC, he supported Zhao Dun's grandson, Zhao Wu (赵武), to head the House of Zhao. In the Battle of Masui (麻隧之战, 578 BC), Han commanded the Jin left wing. During the Battle of Yanling (575 BC), he again commanded the Jin left wing and led a successful flanking maneuver against Chu. In 573 BC, he became Jin's zhengqing (正卿), the highest ministerial office in Ancient China. Han Jue retired in 566 BC due to old age.

Han Jue was played by Huang Xiaoming in the 2010 film Sacrifice.

Ancestors

References

Zhou dynasty nobility
Monarchs of Han (state)
Zhongjunjiang of Jin